Reductive stress is the counterpart to oxidative stress, where electron acceptors are expected to be mostly reduced. It can be caused by excess amounts of glutathione, and can contribute to cytotoxicity. Although different organelles may each have a different redox status, through probing for factors such as glutathione and hydrogen peroxide (H2O2), it was determined that reductive stress is present in the endoplasmic reticulum (ER) of senescent cells. Reductive stress is significant in the aging process of a cell and when ER oxidation status is elevated, cellular aging is slowed. In particular, when reductive stress is increased, it may result in many downstream effects such as increased apoptosis, decreased cell survival, and mitochondrial dysfunction—all of which need to be properly regulated to ensure that the needs of the cell are met. Reductive stress has even been suggested to lead to higher probability of cardiomyopathy in humans. This has also been mysteriously linked to the abundant presence of heat shock protein 27 (Hsp27), suggesting that high levels of Hsp27 induce can induce cardiomyopathy.  Reductive stress is present in many diseases with abnormalities such as the increase of reducing equivalents, resulting in issues such as hypoxia-induced oxidative stress.

See also
 Antioxidative stress

References

Biochemistry